Paykan Tehran Volleyball Club (Bâshgâh-e Vâlibâl-e Peykân-e Tehrân) is an Iranian professional volleyball team based in Tehran, Iran. The team is owned by Iran Khodro, an Iranian automobile manufacturer, and it competes in the Iranian Volleyball Super League. Paykan VC is the volleyball club of the multisport Paykan Sport Club.

History

Establishment
Paykan Tehran Volleyball Club was founded in 1967 in Tehran, Iran, as a part of Paykan Sports Club. They started playing matches in 1969 when they played a series of exhibition games against European opponents.

Success
They are the most successful volleyball club in Iran with 12 league titles. Paykan is also the most decorated club in Asian volleyball, as they have won the Asian Club Championships a record eight times. In 2010 Paykan placed third in the World Club Championships.

Arena
Sapco is the home arena for Paykan and hosts all competitive and official matches. The club uses Number 1 Mix-Use Complex as its training location and also hosts friendly matches for the club.

Team rosters

2015/2016
Team manager:  Amir Mehdi Nafar
Heach coach:  Mohammad Torkashvand

2014/2015
Team manager:  Amir Mehdi Nafar
Heach coach:  Peyman Akbari

Notable former players
  Behnam Mahmoudi
  Mohammad Mousavi
  Alireza Nadi
  Saeid Marouf
  Philippe Barca-Cysique
  Nico Freriks
  Simon Van De Voorde
  Valerio Vermiglio
  Nikolay Nikolov
  Earvin N'Gapeth
  Nimir Abdel-Aziz

Honours

 Iranian Super League
Winners (12): 1997, 1998, 1999, 2000, 2003, 2006, 2007, 2008, 2009, 2010, 2011, 2015
Runners-up (6): 2001, 2002, 2004, 2016, 2017, 2022
Third place (4): 2005, 2012, 2013, 2018

 Asian Club Championship
Winners (8): 2002, 2006, 2007, 2008, 2009, 2010, 2011, 2022
Runners-up (2): 2000, 2004
Third place (2): 1999, 2015

 World Club Championship
Third place (1): 2010
Fourth place (2): 2009, 2015

See also
Shahrdari Varamin VC
Shahrdari Urmia VC

References

External links
 FIVB
 Roster

Iranian volleyball clubs
Sport in Tehran